Mount Kinabalu (Dusun: Gayo Ngaran or Nulu Nabalu) is the highest mountain in Borneo and Malaysia. The mountain is located in Ranau district, West Coast Division of Sabah, Malaysia. It is protected as Kinabalu Park, a World Heritage Site.

The mountain and its surroundings are among the most important biological sites in the world, with between 5,000 and 6,000 species of plants, 326 species of birds, and more than 100 mammalian species identified. Among this rich collection of wildlife are famous species such as the gigantic Rafflesia plants and orangutans. Mount Kinabalu has been accorded UNESCO World Heritage status.

Low's Peak can be climbed by a person in good physical condition and there is no need for mountaineering equipment at any point on the main route, but climbers must be accompanied by accredited guides at all times due to national park regulations and may experience altitude sickness.

Geology 
Mount Kinabalu is essentially a massive pluton formed from granodiorite which is intrusive into sedimentary and ultrabasic rocks, and forms the central part, or core, of the Kinabalu massif. The granodiorite is intrusive into strongly folded strata, probably of Eocene to Miocene age, and associated ultrabasic and basic igneous rocks. It was pushed up from the earth's crust as molten rock millions of years ago. In geological terms, it is a very young mountain as the granodiorite cooled and hardened only about 10 million years ago. 

The present landform is considered to be a mid-Pliocene peneplain, arched and deeply dissected, through which the Kinabalu granodiorite body has risen in isostatic adjustment. Its granitic composition and the glacial formative processes are readily apparent when viewing its craggy rocky peaks.

IUGS geological heritage site
In respect of it being 'one of the youngest granitic intrusions exposed on Earth and the site of spectacular tropical glacial landscapes', the International Union of Geological Sciences (IUGS) included the 'Mount Kinabalu Neogene granite' in its assemblage of 100 'geological heritage sites' around the world in a listing published in October 2022. The organisation defines an IUGS Geological Heritage Site as 'a key place with geological elements and/or processes of international scientific relevance, used as a reference, and/or with a substantial contribution to the development of geological sciences through history.'

Climate 
The climate of the mountain varies from humid tropical at its base to alpine at its summit. Due to the coldness of the mountain from December to January, there are a few occasions where frost and ice appear at the summit of Mount Kinabalu. Snow has been recorded three times in this area; in 1975, 1993 and 2022.

Biology 
Mount Kinabalu along with other upland areas of the Crocker Mountains is known worldwide for its biodiversity with plants of Himalayan, Australasian, and Indomalayan origin. A recent botanical survey of the mountain estimated a staggering 5,000 to 6,000 plant species (excluding mosses and liverworts but including ferns), which is more than all of Europe and North America (excluding tropical regions of Mexico) combined. It is therefore one of the world's most important biological sites. A reason for its rich diversity and endemisms is that its great height could have provided refuge to cold-adapted species during interglacials.

In 2015, a major Malaysian-Dutch study showed that the unique flora, fauna, and fungi on the mountain summit are younger than the mountain itself, and have evolved from both local and distant montane ancestors.

Flora 
The flora of the mountain varies with elevation and geology. Lowland forest extends up to about 1500 metres elevation, and consists of two main types, based on the dominant tree species – mixed dipterocarp forest and mixed Casuarina forest. Lowland forests generally have a closed canopy 40 meters tall, along with an understory stratum of lower trees, and an emergent stratum of taller trees which extend above the canopy.

Montane rain forest, also known as cloud forest, extends from approximately 1400 metres elevation up to 2900 metres. Montane forest typically has a closed canopy with single stratum, and the canopy height generally decreases with elevation. Typical trees include species of the plant families Fagaceae and Lauraceae, with conifers increasingly abundant at higher elevations. The lower montane forests have a high diversity of orchid and fern species. Carnivorous plants, including species of Nepenthes, Drosera, and Utricularia, are most diverse between 2200 and 2550 meters elevation, in areas with high rainfall and a stunted, open tree canopy. The montane forests are interspersed with areas of graminoid scrub, generally associated with hypermagnesic cambisol soils.

It includes short trees and shrubs such the conifer Dacrydium gibbsiae, Leptospermum recurvum, and species from the plant families Myrtaceae and Ericaceae, along with dwarf shrubs, mosses, lichens, liverworts, and ferns. Orchids are abundant and diverse in subalpine and alpine plant communities, except for at the highest summits. Above 3,500 meters conditions are too extreme for trees, and above 3,700 meters persistent ground frost limits plants to the hardiest grasses, sedges and dwarf shrubs, including Leptospermum recurvatum and Rhododendron ericoides, which grow in crevices and other sheltered areas on the rocky summits.

The plants of Mount Kinabalu have high levels of biodiversity and endemism (i.e. species which are found only within Kinabalu Park and are not found anywhere else in the world). Orchids are the best-known example, with 866 species in 134 genera, including species of species of Bulbophyllum, Dendrobium, Coelogyne, Liparis, and Calanthe, and some of the highly-valued Paphiopedilum slipper orchids. There are also over 600 species of ferns (more than the whole of Africa's 500 species) of which 50 are found nowhere else. Mount Kinabalu has the richest collection in the world of Nepenthes pitcher plants (five of the thirteen are found nowhere else on earth), some of which reach spectacular proportions (the largest-pitchered in the world being the endemic Nepenthes rajah). Meanwhile, another Rafflesia species, Rafflesia tengku-adlinii, can be found on the neighbouring Mount Trus Madi and the nearby Maliau Basin.

Mount Kinabalu's above-average biodiversity in plant life is due to a combination of several unique factors: its setting in one of the richest plant regions of the world (the tropical biogeographical region known as western Malesia which comprises the island of Sumatra, the Malay Peninsula, and the island of Borneo), the fact that the mountain covers a wide climatic range from near sea level to freezing ground conditions near the summit, the jagged terrain and diversity of rocks and soils, the high levels of rainfall (averaging about  a year at park HQ), and the climatic instability caused by periods of glaciation and catastrophic droughts which result in evolution and speciation. This diversity is greatest in the lowland regions (consisting of lowland dipterocarp forests, so called because the tree family Dipterocarpaceae are dominant). However, most of Kinabalu's endemic species are found in the mountain forests, particularly on ultramafic soils.

The ultramafic rocks which make up parts of the mountain create soils rich in certain metallic elements (nickel, cobalt, chromium, and manganese), high cation imbalances (high Mg:Ca molar quotients), and deficiencies of some nutrients including potassium and phosphorus. These soil conditions affect the plant life, and plant communities on ultramafic soils show lower stature and lower biomass, higher levels of endemism, and a distinct species composition compared to plant commmunities at similar elevations elsewhere on the mountain.

Fauna 

The variety of plant life is also habitat for a great variety of birds and mammals. There are some 326 species of birds in Kinabalu Park, including the spectacular rhinoceros hornbill, mountain serpent-eagle, Dulit frogmouth, eyebrowed jungle flycatcher, and bare-headed laughingthrush. Twenty-four birds are mainly found on the mountain. The mountain is home to some 100 mammalian species mostly living high in the trees, including one of the four great apes, the orangutan (though sightings of these are uncommon; estimates of its numbers in the park range from 25 to 120). Other mammals include three kinds of deer, the Malayan weasel (Mustela nudipes), oriental small-clawed otter (Aonyx cinerea), and leopard cat (Felis bengalensis). Endemic mammals include the black shrew (Suncus ater). However, others of its endemisms, such as the Bornean ferret-badger (Melogale everetti) and Rattus baluensis, have also recently been recorded in the nearby Mount Tambuyukon.

Endemic annelids number less than a dozen known species but include the Kinabalu giant red leech that preys on various earthworms, including the Kinabalu giant earthworm. In the summit zone, at least 26 endemic species of land snail exist. In 2012, a major scientific expedition, jointly organised by the Malaysian Sabah Parks and the Dutch Naturalis Biodiversity Center, performed DNA analysis of several dozen endemic flora, fauna, and fungi, to understand the evolutionary origin of the unique biodiversity of Kinabalu.

Threats and preservation 

The steep mountainsides with poor soil are not suitable for farming or for the timber industry so the habitats and animal life of Kinabalu remain largely intact, with about a third of the original habitat now degraded. Kinabalu Park was established in 1964 and the nearby mountains were protected as the Crocker Range National Park in 1984. However even national park status does not guarantee full protection, as logging permits were granted on Trus Madi in 1984. Climate Change is likely to reduce the suitable habitat for cold-adapted species from the montane habitats.

History 
British colonial administrator Hugh Low made the first recorded ascent of Mount Kinabalu's summit plateau in March 1851 with local Dusun guide Lemaing of Kampung Kiau. Low did not scale the mountain's highest peak, however, considering it "inaccessible to any but winged animals". In April and July 1858, Low was accompanied on two further ascents by Spenser St. John, the British Consul in Brunei. The highest point of Mount Kinabalu was finally reached in 1888 by zoologist John Whitehead. British botanist Lilian Gibbs became the first woman and the first botanist to summit Mount Kinabalu in February 1910.

Botanist E. J. H. Corner led two important expeditions of the Royal Society of Great Britain to the mountain in 1961 and 1964. Kinabalu National Park was established in 1964. The park was designated a natural World Heritage Site in 2000.

2015 earthquake 

On 5 June 2015 at 07:15 MST, the area around Mount Kinabalu was damaged by an earthquake. Eighteen people, including hikers and mountain guides, were killed by the earthquake and a massive landslide that followed it. Ranau and many parts of Sabah West Coast were affected and Donkey Ear's Peak was heavily damaged.

Six days before the earthquake, around ten western tourists (comprising six men and four women from Canada, Germany, Netherlands and the United Kingdom) "stripped and urinated at the mountain (which locals believe has angered the spirit at the sacred place)". The tourists also allegedly shouted vulgarities when they were told to desist by their mountain guide, but this was later dismissed by the judge in their trial. This provoked outrage among certain Sabahans, who want all of the alleged offenders charged in native court and forced to pay the "sogit", a type of compensation, given in the form of money or livestock, to appease the aggrieved party according to local Kadazan-Dusun customs. It is imposed on wrongdoers for the purpose of appeasing "the aggrieved", thus placating the community. However, as most of the detained tourists have been released from Malaysia's prison and escaping native court, the local villagers had to perform their own rituals. Following the incident, some of the tourists and their families have expressed their apologies to all involved parties, and the government of the United Kingdom began to review its travel advice for Malaysia.

Climbing the mountain 

Climbers must be accompanied by accredited guides at all times due to national park regulations. The latter starting point is slightly higher in elevation, but crosses a ridge, adding about two kilometres to the ascent and making the total elevation gain slightly higher. The Mesilau Trail is no longer accessible due to the earthquake in 2015. The two trails meet about  before Laban Rata.

Sabah Parks grants a summit-climbing permit only to climbers who stay at mountain huts. Due to the limited number of beds at the mountain huts, only 130 people are allowed to climb Mount Kinabalu per day.

Accommodation is available inside the park or outside near the headquarters. Sabah Parks has privatised Mount Kinabalu activities to an organisation called Sutera Sanctuary Lodges. Most people accomplish this part of the climb in 3 to 6 hours. Hot food and beverages are available at Laban Rata. Most rooms have no hot water in the bathrooms and whilst the dining area is heated, most rooms are not. The last part of the climb is on bare granite rock.

Given the high altitude, some people may suffer from altitude sickness although staying overnight at the lodges before the climb and climbing at a lower rate of ascent may reduce the likelihood of this happening.

Low's Gully 
In March 1994 two British Army officers were severely criticised after leading a party of 7 British and 3 Hong Kong soldiers in an attempt to abseil and climb down into the gully that required extensive rescue efforts from both the RAF and the Malaysian army. The party were not equipped with radios and the 2 officers and 3 Hong Kong soldiers were trapped for 16 days and did not eat for five days before being rescued when stretchers were lowered by helicopter. The breakaway party of five completed the first descent of the gully in three days. A book about the 31-day fight for survival entitled Descent into Chaos was published in 1996 and a film drama The Place of the Dead was released in 1997. The first successful complete descent of Low's Gully was achieved by a 27 strong joint Malaysian-British team led by mountaineer and former British Army officer Pat Gunson in 1998.

Naming myths 

There are a few stories that led to the main beliefs in the origin of the mountain's name. 

The first derivation of the word Kinabalu is extracted from the short form for the Kadazan-Dusun word 'Aki Nabalu', meaning "the revered place of the dead".   Meanwhile, it can also be believed that the name "Kinabalu" comes from the Dusun phrase "tina balu" which means "a widow mother". So, assumably, tina balu is the spirit of the mount itself.   Another consideration is Kinabalu is formed by two words of Dusun "ki" (have/has) and "nabalu" (mountain), so "ki-nabalu" means "have mountain". It is common for Dusun people to name places based on what the place has. For example, there is a place named "kiwaig" that literally means "have water". Considering the fact that the word "Kinabalu" in many Dusun dialects literally means 'mountain', this explanation is most likely.

A popular story told to Western and Chinese tourists states that the name "Kinabalu" actually means "Cina Balu" (meaning "A Chinese Widow"). Due to the lingual influence among the Kadazan Dusun of Sabah, the pronunciation for the word "cina" (chee-na) was changed to "Kina" (kee-na). An earlier book by Spenser St. John published in 1863 mentioned the Kina Balu (Chinese widow) as a reference to the mountain.

It was told that a Chinese prince was cast away to Borneo when his ship sank in the middle of the South China Sea. He was subsequently rescued by the natives from a nearby village. As he recovered, he was slowly accepted as one of the people of the village. Eventually, he fell in love with a local woman and married her. Years went by and he started to feel homesick. So he asked permission from his new family to go back to China to visit his parents (the Emperor and Empress of China). To his wife, he promised that as soon as he was done with his family duties in China, he would come back to Borneo to take her and their children back to China. When he made his return to China, he was given a grand welcome by his family. However, to his dismay, his parents disapproved of him bringing his Bornean wife to China. Worse, they told him that he was already betrothed to a princess of a neighbouring kingdom. Having no choice (due to high respect towards his parents), he obeyed with a heavy heart.

Meanwhile, back in Borneo, his wife grew more and more anxious. Eventually, she decided that she would wait for her husband's ship. However, since the village was situated far away from the coast, she couldn't afford to come to the shore and wait for him daily. Instead, she decided to climb to the top of the highest mountain near her village, so that she could have a better view of the ships sailing in the South China Sea. Thus, she was then seen climbing up the mountain at every sunrise, returning only at night to attend to her growing children. Eventually her efforts took their toll. She fell ill, and died at the top of the cold mountain while waiting for her husband. The spirit of the mountain, having observed her for years, was extremely touched by her loyalty towards her husband. Out of admiration for this woman, the spirit of the mountain turned her into a stone. Her face was made to face the South China Sea, so that she could wait forever for her dear husband's return. The people in her hometown who heard about this were also gravely touched by this. Thus, they decided to name the mountain "Kinabalu" in remembrance of her. To them, the mountain is a symbol of the everlasting love and loyalty that should be taken as a good example by women.

Local legend among the people of Ranau, a district in Sabah, has it that St. John's Peak was the stone which her body was turned into.

See also 
 Borneo lowland rain forest – ecoregion
 Borneo montane rain forests – ecoregion
 Kinabalu Park
 Mount Kinabalu International Climbathon

References

Further reading 

 Thomas Fuller (9 April 1999). Into the Mists of Borneo's Kinabalu . The New York Times.
 Hugh; Midori Paxton (7 March 2001). Climb rain forests to the clouds .  The Japan Times.
 Jim Solicki (23 June 2001). They came, they climbed: Mount Kinabalu conquered . The Globe and Mail.
 Jocasta Webb (1 September 2001). The truth about Mount Kinabalu . The Guardian
 Flip Byrnes (18 August 2010). Least-known, most exhilarating hikes . Stuff.co.nz
 Niall McIlroy (9 July 2011). Man versus mountain . The West Australian.
 Gabby Salazar (2 June 2014). Sunrise Hiking on Mount Kinabalu . National Geographic
 Sasha Gonzales (14 April 2015). 'If hell were a mountain, it would look like Mount Kinabalu': a Hong Kong hiker's Borneo blues . South China Morning Post
 Amy Willis (11 June 2015). What are the rules on climbing Mount Kinabalu and why is it so sacred? . Metro.

External links 
 
 Sabah Parks website
 List of climbers who have hiked Mount Kinabalu

 Sabah's Fitus species

 
Mount Kinabalu
Mount Kinabalu
Ecoregions of Malesia
Four-thousanders of Asia
Highest points of countries
Mount Kinabalu
Mount Kinabalu
Mount Kinabalu
Sacred mountains
First 100 IUGS Geological Heritage Sites